(which stands for "All a-Round Intercept and Escort Lady") is a mecha a science fiction novel series by Yūichi Sasamoto, adapted into anime OVA series from 1989 to 1991. ARIEL is also known as The ARIEL Project. The anime was released in the United States by Central Park Media in 2003.

Characters 
Dr. Kishida: a mad scientist from SCEBAI who builds ARIEL and persuades his granddaughters and niece to pilot against Alien invaders.

Mia Kawaii: Dr. Kishida's niece, who is enrolled in college and persuaded to pilot it if her Uncle pays her tuition.

Aya Kishida: a high school student who would rather be studying for her exams than fighting aliens; Dr. Kishida's granddaughter.

Kazumi Kishida: a middle school student who wants to please her grandfather, and really likes piloting ARIEL.

Saber Starblast: a mysterious alien vigilante who helps ARIEL combat the invading Aliens.

Miss Simone: Albert's dreaded accounting department head, sent to personally oversee his overspending.

References

External links
 

1989 anime OVAs
1991 anime OVAs
Alien invasions in television
Central Park Media
J.C.Staff
Mecha anime and manga
Extraterrestrials in anime and manga